Oscar William Swift (April 11, 1869 – June 30, 1940) was a U.S. Representative from New York.

Born in Paines Hollow, New York, Swift moved to Michigan with his parents, who settled in Adrian in 1877.
He attended the public schools and the University of Michigan at Ann Arbor.
He was graduated from the New York Law School, New York City, in 1896.
He was admitted to the bar in 1897 and commenced practice in New York City.

Swift was elected as a Republican to the Sixty-fourth and Sixty-fifth Congresses (March 4, 1915 – March 3, 1919).
He was an unsuccessful candidate for reelection in 1918 to the Sixty-sixth Congress.
He resumed law practice in New York City.
He died in Brooklyn, New York, June 30, 1940.
He was interred in Kensico Cemetery, Valhalla, New York.

Sources

1869 births
1940 deaths
New York Law School alumni
University of Michigan alumni
Burials at Kensico Cemetery
Republican Party members of the United States House of Representatives from New York (state)
People from Little Falls, New York